Judy Melinek (born 1969) is an American forensic pathologist and writer. She is a contract pathologist at the Alameda County Sheriff Coroner's Office and Chief Executive Officer of PathologyExpert Inc.

Early life and education 
Melinek was born in Israel. Her father, a psychiatrist, served as a medic in the Yom Kippur War. Her mother was born in a Siberian refugee camp, and was a passenger on the Haganah boat Exodus. She lost members of her family in the Holocaust. She moved to the United States at the age of five. Melinek lost her father, a doctor, to suicide at the age of 13. She earned her bachelor's degree in biology at Harvard University, which she graduated magna cum laude in 1991. She moved to University of California, Los Angeles, where she studied medicine and trained as a resident in pathology. She earned her Medical doctorate (MD) in 1996. She trained in both forensic pathology and neuropathology, supported by the American Board of Pathology. She also carried out an internship in surgery at the Beth Israel Deaconess Medical Center. Melinek joined the New York autopsy unit, The Pit, in 1999. Melinek was working in the Medical Examiner's Office during the September 11 attacks. She examined the remains of the World Trade Center and American Airlines Flight 587 crash.

Career 
In 2003 Melinek was appointed to the Santa Clara County Office of the Medical Examiner. She moved to the Office of the Chief medical examiner in San Francisco in 2004. Her first book, Working Stiff, is a memoir of her medical training in New York City. It appeared on The New York Times Best Seller list. Melinek is concerned about the shortage of forensic scientists in the United States. Melinek works for the Alameda County Sheriff's Office.

After the National Rifle Association called for doctors who want to reduce gun deaths to stay in their lane, Melinek tweeted "Do you have any idea how many bullets I pull out of corpses weekly? This isn’t just my lane. It’s my fucking highway". In an interview with The Guardian, Melinek said that she conducts one autopsy a week involving a victim of gun crime.

Books 

 
 

Melinek has served as a consultant for ER and MythBusters. She appeared on Science Friday where she discussed working in a city morgue. She is on the editorial board of The American Journal of Forensic Medicine and Pathology.

Personal life 
Melinek is married to T. J. Mitchell, an American scriptwriter. Together they have three children.  In July 2020, Melinek, her husband and two youngest children relocated to New Zealand.

References 

UCSF School of Medicine faculty
David Geffen School of Medicine at UCLA alumni
Harvard College alumni
1970 births
Living people